Ingrid Lotz ( Eichmann on 11 March 1934) is a retired East German discus thrower. She won a silver medal at the 1964 Summer Olympics for the United Team of Germany, with her all-time best throw of 57.21 m. Her husband, Martin Lotz competed in the hammer throw at the same Olympics. Next year she finished third at the 1965 European Cup.

References

1934 births
Living people
German female discus throwers
Athletes (track and field) at the 1964 Summer Olympics
Olympic athletes of the United Team of Germany
Olympic silver medalists for the United Team of Germany
Medalists at the 1964 Summer Olympics
Olympic silver medalists in athletics (track and field)